Schinia scissa is a moth of the family Noctuidae. It is found in North America, including Florida.

External links
Images

Schinia
Moths of North America
Moths described in 1876